Say It to My Face is the third studio album by the Australian Ska band Area-7. It was released in 2001 by Jive Records and Trademark Records and peaked at number 36 on the ARIA Charts.

The album cover was changed just days before the release. The original artwork had an army and war theme, and just before the release of the album the 11 September attacks occurred, so it was changed out of respect for the victims of these attacks.

The song "Individuality" was featured in the Rocket Power television movie Race Across New Zealand on Nickelodeon in 2002.

Track listing
"Leave Me Alone"
"Mind Games"
"Cant Be Happy"
"Now I Know"
"Individuality"
"History Is Written"
"Liar"
"Nobody Likes A Bogan"
"Save Yourself"
"Consequences"
"JJ"
"Kicks"

Charts

References

2001 albums
Area-7 albums